Kvalpyntfonna (Whale Point Glacier) is a glacier at Edgeøya, Svalbard. It covers a mountain area northeast of Kvalpynten. Its summit at 551 m.a.s.l. is the highest point on Edgeøya (while the Müllerberget mountain is the highest bare summit).

See also
List of glaciers in Svalbard

References

Glaciers of Svalbard
Edgeøya